Wizja Jeden was a Polish television channel that was launched on April 1, 1998. The channel was available on Wizja TV and some cable networks. The channel showed comedy related programs. The channel also commissioned dubbed versions of some programs such as South Park, Beavis and Butt-head, and others.

In addition to films, series and programs, the channel also broadcast events from concerts, sporting events and other events such as the Golden Globe Award.

Former programs
 Star Trek
 South Park
 Beavis and Butt-head
 Dilbert
 Daria
 Buffy the Vampire Slayer
 The PJs
 Captain Star
 Bob and Margaret

References

External links

Defunct television channels in Poland
Television channels and stations established in 1998
Television channels and stations disestablished in 2001
1998 establishments in Poland
2001 disestablishments in Poland
Polish-language television stations
Mass media in Warsaw